"Human Nature" is a song recorded by American singer Madonna for her sixth studio album Bedtime Stories (1994). It was written as an answer song to her critics, who had panned her provocative image of the previous two years and Madonna's release of sexually explicit works. Written and produced by Madonna and Dave Hall, "Human Nature" includes a looping sample from Main Source's 1994 track "What You Need", therefore its writers Shawn McKenzie, Kevin McKenzie and Michael Deering are also credited. The track was released on June 6, 1995, by Maverick Records as the fourth and final single from Bedtime Stories.

"Human Nature" is an R&B track where the sound of drums and the sample is heard looping throughout, with Madonna sarcastically asking rhetorical questions based on her real-life actions over the prior two years. The song received mostly positive reviews from music critics who have later noted its anthemic and empowering nature. "Human Nature" became a moderate hit in the United States, peaking at number 46 on the Billboard Hot 100 and at number two on the Hot Dance Club Play chart. In the United Kingdom, the single entered the chart and peaked at number eight and it also charted within the Top 10 in Italy and the Top 20 in Australia.

The accompanying music video was directed by Jean-Baptiste Mondino, and features Madonna and her dancers dressed in latex and leather, while executing highly choreographed dance routines. Inspired by S&M imagery, the video later influenced the work of singers Rihanna and Christina Aguilera. Madonna has performed "Human Nature" on four of her concert tours, most recently on the 2019–20 Madame X Tour. In 2012, during The MDNA Tour, the performance of the song became the subject of controversy, when the singer exposed her nipples during a show in Istanbul.

Background and release 

In 1992, Madonna released the coffee table book Sex and her fifth studio album Erotica, both being of explicit sexual content. She also starred in the erotic thriller Body of Evidence the next year. Madonna promoted Erotica with the Girlie Show, which was met with protests and boycott threats due to its explicit content. In March 1994, Madonna's appearance on Late Show with David Letterman was highly criticized for her controversial behavior and usage of profanity. The release of her sexually explicit film, album and book, and the aggressive appearance on Letterman all made critics question Madonna as a sexual renegade. She faced strong negative publicity from critics and fans, who commented that "she had gone too far" and that her career was over.

Madonna wanted to tone down her explicit image. Her first attempt was to release the tender ballad "I'll Remember" (1994) from the soundtrack of the film With Honors. Musically she wanted to move in a new musical direction and started exploring new-jack R&B styles with a generally mainstream, radio-friendly sound. She incorporated it in her sixth studio album, Bedtime Stories, released in October 1994. Journalist Mary von Aue from Vice magazine noted that Madonna and her publicist Liz Rosenberg started promoting Bedtime Stories as an apology album with the promotional videos promising that there would be "no sexual references on the album".

However, the singer was still seething about how the media had treated her unfairly over the last two years. When she started working with producer Dave Hall on the album, she wrote an answer song for the media. Titled "Human Nature", it directly addressed the media and the press who had criticized her for dealing with taboo issues with her previous record and tried to punish her for that. "I'm saying in the song that I'm giving my back to them. I'm not sorry", Madonna explained. Described by Billboard as "Madonna taking on her critics more directly than ever with a logical, defiant attack on slut-shaming", the song was also about closing the book on the previous two years of her life. "Human Nature" eventually became the fourth and final single released from Bedtime Stories on June 6, 1995, by Maverick Records. 25 years later, the remixes were uploaded to streaming and digital download services in celebration of its anniversary, in the midst of Pride Month.

Recording and composition 
"Human Nature" was written and produced by Madonna and Hall. The song was recorded and mixed by Frederick Jorio and P. Dennis Mitchell with Robert Kiss working as an assistant engineer during the sessions and Joey Moskowitz doing the programming. Musically, "Human Nature" is a R&B song with a hip-hop influenced beat. It also includes a looping sample from the song "What You Need" performed by hip-hop group Main Source along with the sound of slamming doors, therefore its writers Shawn McKenzie, Kevin McKenzie and Michael Deering are also credited.

"Human Nature" begins in a trip hop style with the sound of bass and drums and Madonna whispering "express yourself, don't repress yourself". Throughout the song, the music continues looping around the same chord sequence and Madonna utters whispered phrases to counterpoint the actual lyrics. Her vocals utilized the 1990s soul style of music with a nasal, thin sound. The chorus ends with the line "I'm not your bitch, Don't hang your shit on me" which was often censored by the radio stations from airplay. Unlike the other tracks on the album, "Human Nature" does not employ the pentatonic melody and is devoid of the melancholy nature of Bedtime Stories, as observed by Jon Pareles of The New York Times. Composed in the time signature of common time, "Human Nature" has a key of C major while progressing in 88 beats per minute. Madonna's "nasal" vocals range from F3 to E7 and the song follows a repetitive sequence of Fmaj7–E7–Am7–Fmaj7–E7–Am7 as its chord progression.

Rikky Rooksby, author of The Complete Guide to the Music of Madonna felt that the lyrics, along with being an answer-song, could also be interpreted as a rebellious one, where Madonna looks back on a relationship where she was not allowed to speak her mind. The song's lyrics contain sarcastic backing vocals with Madonna asking rhetorical questions based on her real-life actions, such as "Did I say something wrong? Oops, I didn't know I couldn't talk about sex. I must have been crazy," as well as the line "What was I thinking?" Madonna explained that the lyrics were about "basically saying don't put me in a box, don't pin me down, don't tell me what I can and can't say. It's about breaking out of the restraints." With the Los Angeles Times she further clarified that there was defensiveness in the lyrics for "Human Nature", as well as sarcasm and unapologetic.

"Human Nature" received nine official remixes, with most of them converting the R&B music into house. The radio edit omitted the line ""I'm not your bitch/Don't hang your shit on me", which AllMusic's Jose F. Promis felt "lack[ed] the punchline" and made it repetitive. The "Runway Club Mix" is stripped down while the "I'm Not Your Bitch Mix" replaced the verse and the chorus with whispered comments like "I have no regrets", "I'm not your bitch", "Deal with it" and "I'm HIV negative" which are added over a much deeper house groove. The hip hop mixes include one clean and one adult rated version. According to Promis, the "Love is the Nature Mix" was the best remix created, describing it as containing "swirling instruments", which converted the song into a dance track.

Critical reception 

"Human Nature" received mostly positive reviews from music critics. Sal Cinquemani of Slant Magazine gave the song a positive review, stating that "for years, Madonna spoke in metaphors, fantasies and blatant shock tactics, but the performer indignantly struck back at her critics on 'Human Nature'. She didn't just hold up a mirror, she became the mirror". Barbara O'Dair from Rolling Stone also gave a positive review of the song, commenting that "Madonna does a drive-by on her critics, complete with a keening synth line straight outta Dre", adding that "Madonna's message is still 'Express yourself, don't repress yourself.' This time, however, it comes not with a bang but a whisper". Scott Kearnan of The Boston Globe included the track at number 11 on his list of "30 Ultimate Madonna Singles", stating that the line "Absolutely no regrets" was a "Madonna mantra if ever there was one". Medium's Richard LaBeau deemed it "one of Madonna’s best forays into R&B, this all-around-clever song features bold, unapologetic lyrics that serves as her unofficial manifesto".

Billboard was also positive, stating that "radio to hungrily come to the table and dine on this wickedly catchy jeep/pop jam in which La M unapologetically snaps at her more close-minded critics". The magazine complimented her vocals which were "playfully snide and aggressive, holding strong against a forceful hip-hop groove and a host of ear-pleasing funk guitar links and synth hoops". Music Week gave it four out of five, adding that "Maddy gets quirky on the hippest and most memorable track from Bedtime Stories". Author Chris Wade wrote in his book, The Music of Madonna, that "Human Nature" lifted the sadness emanated from the first few tracks from the album. "There's a great beat to this, a brilliant vocal where Madonna answers herself with whispers and an unforgettable chorus," Wade added. Matthew Rettenmund wrote in his Encyclopedia Madonnica that "in spite of the chart performance", the song has become a modern "self-empowerment anthem". Charles Aaron from Spin described the song as "slinking through [Hall's] low-ridin', gum-smackin' groove, Maddy's hard-bitten ingenue expresses no regrets, but this time you feel for her." Aaron highlighted the lyrics "Would it sound better if I were a man?" as subversive and coy. Author Lucy O'Brien described in her book, Madonna: Like an Icon, that "Human Nature" was one of the "quirkiest" tracks on Bedtime Stories, "throbbing with a tightly restrained but devastating anger".

For Barry Walters from Moscow-Pullman Daily News, the song had the catchiest chorus among all the other tracks from the album. Jim Farber from Entertainment Weekly gave the song a negative review, noting that Madonna's "on far surer ground thrashing through such neurotic (if not uncommon) views of relationships than she is trashing the media. In striking back at her critics, Madonna simply sounds self-righteous and smug. 'I didn't know I couldn't talk about sex,' she sneers in 'Human Nature'. 'Did I say something true?' Yes. But tooting your own horn about it just sounds petty". Rooksby said that the repetition of the sample was "wearing" and it "did not suggest that the world of the singer was very appealing". Calling it the singer's "best excursion into the sounds of hip-hop and R&B", Jude Rogers from The Guardian placed the track at number 15 on her ranking of Madonna's singles, in honor of her 60th birthday. Entertainment Weeklys Chuck Arnold called it a "defiant declaration [...] the original unapologetic bitch", listing it as Madonna's 24th best single.

Chart performance 

"Human Nature" debuted at number 57 on the US Billboard Hot 100, for the week ending June 24, 1995, with 7,400 units sold. It reached its peak position three weeks later, at number 46. "Human Nature" became Madonna's second consecutive single not to enter the top 40 in the United States, following her previous single "Bedtime Story", which had reached a peak of number 42. Fred Bronson from Billboard reported that although the song had moved up the chart with a positive bullet point, the song being a risky choice for radio, it stalled progress and failed to become Madonna's 33rd top 40 hit. "Human Nature" was a success on the dance chart, peaking at number two on Hot Dance Club Play. It also peaked at number 35 on Hot 100 Singles Sales, number 58 on Hot 100 Airplay, and number 57 on Hot R&B/Hip-Hop Songs. In Canada, "Human Nature" debuted at number 90 on the RPM Singles Chart on July 10, 1995. It reached a peak of number 64 on the chart and was present for a total of seven weeks only.

In the United Kingdom, "Human Nature" entered the chart at its peak position of number eight, but rapidly descended down the charts, being present for a total of six weeks only. According to the Official Charts Company, it has sold a total of 80,685 copies as of August 2008. In Australia, the single peaked within the top 20, at number 17, on the ARIA Charts. On the Irish Singles Chart the song peaked just outside the top 20, at number 21. It was not as successful in New Zealand, peaking at number 37, making it Madonna's poorest performing single to stay on the chart for a sole week. The song reached the top 20 in Finland and Switzerland, peaking at number seven and number 17 respectively, while in Germany it reached a peak of number 50.

Music video

Development 

The accompanying music video for "Human Nature" was directed by Jean-Baptiste Mondino, who had previously directed Madonna's videos for "Open Your Heart" and "Justify My Love". It was shot over two days, May 6 to 7, 1995 at Raleigh Studios in Hollywood, California and was created under Palomar Productions' Anita Wetterstedt. The video was choreographed by Jamie King, who later directed Madonna's concert tours. "She wanted me to dance in her 'Human Nature' video. I didn't want to do it, but she begged", he stated. King was one of the dancers in the S&M attires hanging down from a swinging trapeze in the video. Her dancer Luca Tommassini was the choreography assistant. Madonna's main inspiration behind the video was the work of artist Eric Stanton who did S&M inspired drawings. The singer enlisted Mondino to direct the video and wanted to be about the fun aspects of Stanton's work and more dance-oriented than her previous videos from Bedtime Stories. For Mondino, the main problem was that he did not prefer too much dancing in the videos, because that resulted in extra editing.
I remember most of the video you had shot with the crane, some Steadicam, plus some panning. So you have about five different cameras shooting a performance, and after they edit like crazy. It gives you a lot of freedom, but I feel very frustrated because I like to see somebody dancing. I hate when there's too much editing. I like the steadiness of the performance because then you can really enjoy the movement of the body. You see the skill.
So Mondino came up with the concept of boxes and had Madonna and the dancers perform choreography inside them. The director was satisfied since the small space of the boxes meant there was not much movement, and he could create the desired graphic S&M imagery and choreography. According to Dustin Robertson, editor of the video, Mondino and Madonna both had opposite work ethics. While Mondino was "cool and laid-back", Madonna was a "stickler for details" and the former had "a wonderful way of handling her, while she demanded a strong handler to pull out the best she's got to give".

Release and reception 

The music video premiered on May 19, 1995, through MTV. It features Madonna, her dancers, and her chihuahua Chiquita in black leather and latex outfits. The S&M inspired outfits were to symbolize the "breaking out of the restraints" as the lyrics described. Her hair, which appears brown in the video was actually blonde at the time. She had leather strips painstakingly braided into her hair to blend with her dark roots. The frizzy afro she sports halfway through the video was actually a hairpiece. During the middle of the video, Madonna and her dancers appear in a series of boxes, trying to break free. Another sequence shows the singer being thrown around within a series of ropes managed by her dancers. The video concludes with Madonna sitting in a chair, looking straight into the camera as she says the line "Absolutely no regrets!" followed by a brief shot of her standing next to the chair as she boxes into the air.

Rettenmund complimented the video saying "God Bless [Mondino]... One of Madonna's worst performing singles was nonetheless given one of her best videos... Simply staged, it is equal parts funny and sexy... If its possible for one video to sum up Madonna's Madonna-ness, 'Human Nature' is that video". Louis Virtel from The Backlot ranked the video at number 22 on a list for "Madonna's 55 Best Videos", and called it "tongue-in-cheek, pleather-heavy". He went on to say that "It's rare that Madonna gets a chance to be both harsh and hilarious in a music video", and in this one, "Madonna basically does whatever the hell she wants. Brandish a chihuahua? Mock and celebrate kinkiness? Sneer at the camera like a bored third-grader? She does it all, and even in black cornrows, she's a vision of coolness and sexual superiority". Carol Vernallis, writer of Experiencing Music Video: Aesthetics and Cultural Context noted that the concept of black outfit against a white background "works well, but the snare drum, which corresponds to nothing in the imagery, seems to float above the soundtrack".

Roger Beebe, one of the authors of the book Medium Cool: Music Videos from Soundies to Cellphones noted that the video was an example of the viewer's impulse being intensified regarding "what will happen next?" by placing its primary performers against a stark background. In 2011, singer Rihanna's music video for the song "S&M" was compared to "Human Nature"s music video with James Montgomery from MTV News saying that the video for "S&M" was not a new concept and was done in the video for "Human Nature". Montgomery also noted that singer Christina Aguilera's music video for 2010 single "Not Myself Tonight" was heavily inspired by that of "Human Nature", including scenes portraying Aguilera in "leather get-ups, her dominatrix attitude and the sultry chair-related activities she engages in throughout". The New York Times compared "Not My Responsibility" (a track from Billie Eilish's 2021 studio album Happier Than Ever) with "Human Nature", saying that "at times, it recalls the sensual provocations of Madonna’s mid-90s era more than any other contemporary pop album, the unapologetic spoken-word manifesto "Not My Responsibility" has more than a tinge of "Human Nature". The music video further inspired the dancing and the video of the song "Kambaqt Ishq", from the 2001 Bollywood film, Pyaar Tune Kya Kiya. It can be found on the Madonna compilations, The Video Collection 93:99 (1999) and Celebration: The Video Collection (2009).

Live performances 
Madonna has performed "Human Nature" four times on tour. During the 2001 Drowned World Tour, she performed the song dressed as a cowgirl while slow-riding on a mechanical bull, which was considered by Rob Mancini from MTV News as "magical". For John McAlley from Entertainment Weekly, Madonna "prompts the oddly natural sight of lap-dancing a mechanical bull". Similar review was shared by Alexis Petridis from The Guardian, who noted that the media had heavily reported on the tour making all the details available from much before the London show that he reviewed. Nevertheless, Madonna riding the bull and performing "Human Nature" was one of the "most startling moments" of the tour according to him. The performance of the song on August 26, 2001, at The Palace of Auburn Hills was recorded and released in the live video album, Drowned World Tour 2001.

Madonna performed the song again on her 2008–09 Sticky & Sweet Tour, while playing an electric guitar and adding vocoder voice effects on the background harmonies. The singer was dressed in a black leotard and fishnet tights. She also wore a white hat and black leather boots. During the performance a video backdrop portrayed American singer Britney Spears trapped in an elevator and trying to get out, while kicking the walls. At the end of the performance, the doors opened to reveal Spears saying the phrase "It's Britney, bitch", from her song "Gimme More" (2007). Madonna explained that she intended the video to stand as an analogy of Spears' career, saying "Didn't that explain what I thought? 'I'm not your bitch, don't hang your shit on me". On November 6, 2008 in the Los Angeles show at Dodger Stadium, Spears joined Madonna onstage halfway through the performance. Aidin Vaziri from Gibson.com was positive in his review, saying that the best moment of the tour was when Madonna picked up her black Les Paul guitar and emulated musician Slash while performing the song. Paul Schrodt from Slant Magazine was negative in his review of the performance, saying that by the time the performance of "Human Nature" had started, "it's the same as all her shows: A remixed mind-fuck". The performance was included on the Sticky & Sweet Tour live CD and DVD release, recorded during Madonna's four shows in Buenos Aires, Argentina, in December 2008.

In 2012, Madonna performed the song on The MDNA Tour as part of the third segment of the show. She performed the song while her dancers moved mirrors around her, as she removed articles of clothing. At her concert in Istanbul on June 7, 2012, Madonna briefly exposed her right breast to the audience, before covering it up again. This prompted criticism about her age, with Sophie Wilkinson from Heat World asking, "at 54, is she too old to be getting a boob out?" The striptease towards the end of the song continued in other cities where the tour visited, and most of the times the singer had messages written across her back talking about social issues. Amy Odell from The Huffington Post said that criticizing the gesture based on her age sends "a very archaic message", adding that "Women who are 53 still have breasts and... sex drives!". The performance of the song at the November 19–20, 2012, shows in Miami, at the American Airlines Arena were recorded and released in Madonna's fourth live album, MDNA World Tour. In April 2015, Madonna performed "Human Nature" along with her 2005 song "Hung Up" as a medley at the Coachella Festival during Drake's act, sporting thigh-high boots and a tank top that read "Big as Madonna". She then went on to kiss Drake, whose shocked expression was popular on the Internet. The rapper then revealed that he actually enjoyed the kiss, posting a picture of the moment on his Instagram account. Madonna included "Human Nature" on the first section of her Madame X Tour (2019–20), featuring her doing a spreadeagle position.

Track listings and formats 

UK cassette single
"Human Nature" (Radio Edit) – 4:09
"Human Nature" (Chorus Door Slam with Nine Sample) – 4:48

UK/Germany CD maxi single
"Human Nature" (Radio Edit) – 4:09
"Human Nature" (Human Club Mix) – 9:05
"Human Nature" (The Runway Club Mix) – 8:19
"Human Nature" (Master With Nine Sample) – 4:48
"Human Nature" (I'm Not Your Bitch mix) – 8:11

Digital single / US, Canada & Australia CD maxi single
"Human Nature" (Radio Edit) – 4:09
"Human Nature" (Runway Club Mix Radio Edit) – 3:58
"Human Nature" (Runway Club Mix) – 8:18
"Human Nature" (I'm Not Your Bitch Mix) – 8:10
"Human Nature" (Howie Tee Remix) – 4:47
"Human Nature" (Howie Tee Clean Remix) – 4:46
"Human Nature" (Radio Version) – 4:30
"Human Nature" (Bottom Heavy Dub) – 8:08
"Human Nature" (Love Is the Nature Mix) – 6:41

US CD / cassette / 7" single
"Human Nature" (Radio version) – 4:30
"Sanctuary" (Album version) – 5:03

Germany CD single
"Human Nature" (Album version) – 4:54
"Bedtime Story" (Junior's Sound Factory Mix) – 9:15
"Bedtime Story" (Orbital Mix) – 7:41

US 12" maxi single
"Human Nature" (Runway Club Mix) – 8:18
"Human Nature" (I'm Not Your Bitch Mix) – 8:10
"Human Nature" (Runway Club Mix Radio Edit) – 3:58
"Human Nature" (Bottom Heavy Dub) – 8:08
"Human Nature" (Howie Tee Remix) – 4:47
"Human Nature" (Howie Tee Clean Remix) – 4:46
"Human Nature" (Radio Edit) – 4:07

Germany 12" single
"Human Nature" (Album version) – 4:54
"Bedtime Story" (Junior's Sound Factory Mix) – 9:15
"Bedtime Story" (Junior's Wet Dream Mix) – 8:33

Credits and personnel 

Madonna – lead vocals, songwriter, producer
Dave Hall – songwriter, producer
Shawn McKenzie – songwriter
Kevin McKenzie – songwriter
 Milo Deering – songwriter
Frederick Jorio – mixing
P. Dennis Mitchell – mixing
Robert Kiss – assistant engineer
Joey Moskowitz – programming
Paolo Roversi – cover art, photographer, designer
Michael Penn – designer

Credits and personnel adapted from Bedtime Stories album liner notes.

Charts

Weekly charts

Year-end charts

References

Bibliography 

1994 songs
1995 singles
Madonna songs
Songs with feminist themes
Songs written by Dave Hall (record producer)
Songs written by Madonna
Song recordings produced by Dave Hall (record producer)
Song recordings produced by Madonna
Music videos directed by Jean-Baptiste Mondino
Maverick Records singles
American contemporary R&B songs